This list is a compilation of experiments measuring the cosmic microwave background (CMB) radiation anisotropies and polarization since the first detection of the CMB by Penzias and Wilson in 1964.  There have been a variety of experiments to measure the CMB anisotropies and polarization since its first observation in 1964 by Penzias and Wilson. These include a mix of ground-, balloon- and space-based receivers. Some notable experiments in the list are COBE, which first detected the temperature anisotropies of the CMB, and showed that it had a black body spectrum; DASI, which first detected the polarization signal from the CMB; CBI, which made high-resolution observations and obtained the first E-mode polarization spectrum; WMAP; and the Planck spacecraft, which has produced the highest resolution all-sky map to-date of both the temperature anisotropies and polarization signals.  Current scientific goals for CMB observation include precise measurement of gravitational lensing, which can constrain the mass of the neutrino; and measurement of B-mode polarization as possible evidence for cosmic inflation.

The design of cosmic microwave background experiments is a very challenging task.  The greatest problems are the receivers, the telescope optics and the atmosphere. Many improved microwave amplifier technologies have been designed for microwave background applications. Some technologies used are HEMT, MMIC, SIS and bolometers. Experiments generally use elaborate cryogenic systems to keep the amplifiers cool. Often, experiments are interferometers which only measure the spatial fluctuations in signals on the sky, and are insensitive to the average 2.7 K background.

Another problem is the 1/f noise intrinsic to all detectors. Usually the experimental scan strategy is designed to minimize the effect of such noise.  To minimize side lobes, microwave optics usually utilize elaborate lenses and feed horns. Finally, in ground-based (and, to an extent, balloon-based) instruments, water and oxygen in the atmosphere emit and absorb microwave radiation.  Even at frequencies where the atmospheric transmission is high, atmospheric emission contributes photon noise that limits the sensitivity of an experiment.  CMB research therefore uses of air- and space-borne experiments, as well as dry, high altitude locations such as the Chilean Andes and the South Pole.

Cosmic microwave background experiments

The list below consists of a partial list of past, current and planned CMB experiments. The name, start and end years of each experiment are given, followed by the basis of the experiment—whether space, balloon or ground based—and the location where appropriate. The frequency and amplifier technologies used are given, as is the main targets of the experiments.

References

Further reading
 NASA, 2015, "Hosted Data on LAMBDA: CMB Experiments," see , accessed 27 March 2015.